Klamath Falls City Hall is a city hall building in Klamath Falls, Oregon, in the United States. It was built in 1914 and added to the National Register of Historic Places on October 30, 1989.

It is a two-and-a-half-story Beaux Arts-style building designed by Earl Veghte, a young architect.

It has four colossal Ionic columns.  It has brick and contrasting concrete trim elements, including flat-arched lintels with raised keystones and voussoirs.

See also
 National Register of Historic Places listings in Klamath County, Oregon

References

1914 establishments in Oregon
Beaux-Arts architecture in Oregon
Buildings and structures in Klamath Falls, Oregon
City halls in Oregon
Government buildings completed in 1914
National Register of Historic Places in Klamath County, Oregon
City and town halls on the National Register of Historic Places in Oregon